Henry Stephen Clubb (June 21, 1827 – October 29, 1921) was a British-American Swedenborgian, abolitionist, chartist, journalist and author, who was state senator for Michigan and founder and first President of the Vegetarian Society of America (VSA).

Biography 

Clubb was born on June 21, 1827 in Colchester, England. He had at least one brother, Robert, and one sister, Sarah Anne. His father, Stephen Clubb, was a Swedenborgian and raised his son in the same faith. Both of his parents were vegetarians for a time; they were also members of the Vegetarian Society. Clubb was inspired to become a vegetarian by W. Gibson Ward's visits to his father's home, where he listened to Ward's vivid descriptions of the horrors and cruelties of the slaughter house.

Clubb was working as a clerk at the post office when he heard about a London-based commercial traveler named William Ward about a community called the Concordium and practicing an alternative lifestyle. This community, later called Alcott House was found in Ham Common, and influenced by transcendentalism. In 1842, Clubb joined this community. His journey there was via London, his first visit to the English capital and his first journey by train. After the project failed, he moved to London and worked with James Simpson, a cowherdite and vegetarian. In 1850, he joined the Bible Christian Church, a sect founded by William Cowherd. He also became the local secretary of the Vegetarian Society in Salford.

In 1853, Clubb emigrated to the United States and initially found work as a journalist in New York, where he worked alongside Charles A. Dana for the  New-York Tribune. As an abolitionist and pacifist, he lectured against slavery.

Clubb married Anne Barbara Henderson on November 15, 1855, in  Allegan, Michigan; they had three daughters.

Between 1856 and 1857, he was involved with Charles DeWolfe and John McLaurin in building a utopian community known as Octagon City, Kansas. This project was originally designed as a vegetarian colony, but changed its focus to promoting a highly moral society with the octagon as its basic architectural structure, as propagated by Orson Fowler. The project failed due to mosquitoes, malnutrition, grain thefts and general exhaustion in the inhospitable terrain.

In the American Civil War, Clubb fought for the Union Army as a quartermaster. He took part in the Siege of Vicksburg, with his wife accompanying him. Clubb was hit by a bullet, but survived because the bullet was slowed down when it passed through his pocket which was filled with money and his naturalization papers, which were destroyed.

Living in Grand Haven, Michigan, he published the Grand Haven Herald newspaper, and served as state senator from the 29th District in 1873-74.

He briefly returned to England in 1901, visiting Salford. In 1907, he decided to write a history of vegetarianism, to be published in the Chicago Vegetarian Magazine. Clubb's wife died in 1915.

Clubb died in Philadelphia, on October 29, 1921, at the age of 94. He is buried at Oakwood Cemetery, Sharon, Pennsylvania, with his wife and daughters.

Vegetarian Society of America 

Clubb founded the Vegetarian Society of America (VSA) in 1866 and became its first president. He published a cookbook for the organization and founded its magazine Food, Home and Garden. In 1893, Clubb was largely responsible for the success of the International Congress for Vegetarians at the Chicago World's Fair.

In 1900, the VSA merged with the Chicago Vegetarian Society. The VSA's Food, Home and Garden was renamed The Vegetarian and Our Fellow Creatures (1901-1903), The Vegetarian Magazine (1903-1925), The Vegetarian Magazine and Fruitarian (1925-1926) and The Vegetarian and Fruitarian (1926-1934).

Selected publications 

 The Maine Liquor Law: Its Origin, History, and Results, Including a Life of Hon. Neal Dow (1856)
 Thirty-nine Reasons Why I Am a Vegetarian (1903)
 Unpolished Rice, the Staple Food of the Orient (1905)

References

Further reading

External links 

 
 The Vegetarians - episode 13 of The Vegan Option podcast discusses the life of Henry S. Clubb
 

1827 births
1921 deaths
Military personnel from Colchester
19th-century American clergy
19th-century American journalists
19th-century American male writers
19th-century American politicians
19th-century British journalists
19th-century English clergy
19th-century English politicians
20th-century American clergy
20th-century American male writers
20th-century American politicians
20th-century British journalists
20th-century English clergy
20th-century English politicians
American abolitionists
American male journalists
American male non-fiction writers
American pacifists
American temperance activists
American vegetarianism activists
Burials in Pennsylvania
Chartists
Christian abolitionists
Christian vegetarianism
English abolitionists
English activists
English emigrants to the United States
English journalists
English male non-fiction writers
English pacifists
English temperance activists
Expatriate journalists in the United States
New-York Tribune personnel
Organization founders
Michigan state senators
People from Colchester
Union Army soldiers